Hannover House is an American entertainment media distributor, specializing in the manufacture and release of pre-recorded movies and programs onto DVD and Blu-ray video devices, and the publication of literary and non-fiction books. Hannover is also active in the release of higher-profile films to theaters and to the domestic (North American) television markets. Principal offices, warehousing and production facilities for Hannover House are located in Springdale, Arkansas, near the world headquarters for Wal-Mart Stores, Inc.  The company also maintains an office in Los Angeles, California, and runs its publicity and promotional activities out of New York, New York.  Hannover House is a publicly traded company on the OTC Markets, symbol HHSE.  The company has posted five years of consecutive profitability since becoming a publicly traded company in January 2010, and is on track for a significant growth during 2016.

History
Hannover was established in 1993 as a California corporation. Hannover House concentrated its activities exclusively in the literary, book-publishing industries until 2003 when the company entered into the DVD marketplace. It expanded into theatrical distribution in 2007.

In 2003, the company published the book Blood, Money and Power: How L.B.J. Killed J.F.K. by Barr McClellan, which argues that the assassination of President John F. Kennedy was arranged by his vice president and successor, Lyndon B. Johnson.

In December 2009, Eric Parkinson and his operating partner D. Frederick Shefte entered into an agreement to reverse merge with the publicly traded Target Development Group, Inc. Simultaneous with the December, 2009 merger transaction, the officers and directors of Target were restructured to add Hannover House executives to the board, with Eric Parkinson also tapped as Chairman / CEO and Fred Shefte as President. Parkinson brought over 30-years of indie-studio management experience to Hannover House, including a notable string of hits as C.E.O. of Hemdale Communications, Inc.   Shefte is an attorney as well as a business entrepreneur.  In June, 2014, Hannover House announced the hiring of Tom Sims as Vice-President of Sales.  Sims is a veteran of more than 20 years in the home entertainment industry, having previously worked as Video Manager for powerhouse wholesaler Anderson Merchandisers, as well as Senior Director of National Accounts for Universal Studios Music Group / Vivendi, and most recently as Vice-President of Corporate Development for Allegro Media Group, Inc.

In addition to Parkinson, Shefte and Sims, other key staffers include: Jayson Blocksidge (Film Booking), Desiree Garnier (Director of Promotions),Taylor Wyatt (Technical Services), Melissa Welch (Accounting) and Tyrone Welch (Shipping & Operations).

Releases announced as of January 1, 2016 include for DVD and Blu-ray: Dancin' It's On, The Algerian, Bonobos: Back to the Wild, Day of Redemption; and for theatrical: Encounter, Union Bound, Borrar De La Memoria, Accidental Exorcist, and Unlimited.

Films

2013

DVD
GRIM

2012

Theatrical
Borrar de la Memoria
Toys in the Attic
The Weather Station

2011

Theatrical
All's Faire in Love
Cook County
Humans Vs. Zombies
Turtle: The Incredible Journey

DVD
Boggy Creek: The legend is True
Turtle: The Incredible Journey

VOD
Racing Dreams
Turtle: The Incredible Journey
Twelve

2010

Theatrical
Racing Dreams
Twelve

DVD
2 Dudes and a Dream
Boiler Maker
Chelsea on the Rocks
Racing Dreams
Sensored
War Eagle, Arkansas

2009
Come Away Home
The Hiding
Hounddog
The Last Brickmaker in America

2008 and earlier
AFP: American Fighter Pilot
Ambrose Bierce: Civil War Stories
Animal Clinic
Blonde and Blonder
Christmas in the Clouds
D.R.E.A.M. Team
Dawn of the Living Dead
Delivering Milo
Fat Rose and Squeaky
The Fun Park
Future Shock
Glitz 'N' Glamour with the Bratz
Grand Champion
Island of Champions
The Joyriders
The Keeper: The Legend of Omar Khayyam
Kids World
Livin' It Up with the Bratz
Los Van Van: Live in Cuba
Mind Your Manners
Moon of the Desperados
The New Adventures of Pinocchio
New Sounds of Cuba
Off the Lip
On Life and Enlightenment: Principles of Buddhism with His Holiness the Dalai Lama
Out of the Blue
Outlaws: The Legend of O.B. Taggart
Razor Sharpe
The Roswell Crash: Startling New Evidence
Samurai: The Last Warrior
Savage Land
Siegfried & Roy: The Magic Box
Teen Yoga
Why Wal-Mart Works; and Why That Drives Some People C-R-A-Z-Y

References

External links
 Official website

Book publishing companies of the United States
Film distributors of the United States
Film production companies of the United States
Companies based in Arkansas
Benton County, Arkansas
Springdale, Arkansas
Publishing companies established in 1993